General Sir Archibald Alison, 2nd Baronet  (21 January 1826 – 5 February 1907) was a Scottish soldier who achieved high office in the British Army in the 1880s. He was a descendant of the Alison family presented by Francis Galton in Hereditary Genius (1869) as an example of genius inherited over several generations.

Military career
Born on 21 January 1826, in Edinburgh, the son of Archibald Alison, the advocate and historian, and educated at Glasgow University, and Edinburgh University, Alison was commissioned  into the 72nd Regiment of Foot in 1846. He went on to serve at the Siege of Sevastopol during the Crimean War in 1855.

He served as Military Secretary to Sir Colin Campbell during the Indian Mutiny in 1857, losing an arm at the relief of Lucknow, and was appointed a Companion of the Order of the Bath (CB). He was appointed Assistant Adjutant General in the office of the Inspector General of Infantry in 1862, Assistant Adjutant General for the South Western District in 1864 and Assistant Adjutant General at Aldershot in 1870. In 1873 Alison was given command of the British brigade in West Africa during the Anglo-Ashanti wars and fought at the Battle of Amoaful.

He went on to be Deputy Adjutant General in Ireland in 1874, Commandant of the Staff College, Sandhurst in February 1878 and Deputy Quartermaster General, Intelligence in May 1878. He commanded the Highland Brigade during the Battle of Tel el-Kebir in September 1882. In late 1882 he was appointed General Officer Commanding British Troops in Egypt and in 1883 he became GOC for Aldershot District.

He was given the colonelcy of the Essex Regiment in 1896, transferring to be colonel of the Seaforth Highlanders in 1897, a position he held until his death.

Alison was promoted to Knight Commander of the Order of the Bath (KCB) in 1874, and further raised to Knight Grand Cross (GCB) in 1887.

He died on 5 February 1907 and is buried at Dean Cemetery in Edinburgh.

Family
In 1858 he married Jane Black. They had two sons and four daughters.

References

|-
 

1826 births
1907 deaths
British Army generals
Knights Grand Cross of the Order of the Bath
Seaforth Highlanders officers
Alumni of the University of Glasgow
Alumni of the University of Edinburgh
Military personnel from Edinburgh
Scottish knights
Scottish generals
Scottish Episcopalians
72nd Highlanders officers
Baronets in the Baronetage of the United Kingdom
Commandants of the Staff College, Camberley
British Army personnel of the Crimean War
Scottish amputees
British military personnel of the Indian Rebellion of 1857
British military personnel of the Third Anglo-Ashanti War
British Army personnel of the Anglo-Egyptian War
Burials at the Dean Cemetery